Keď sa raz oči dohodnú is the eight studio album by the Modus band, released on OPUS Records in 1988.

Track listing

Official releases
 1988: Keď sa raz oči dohodnú, LP, MC, CD, OPUS, #9313 1989

Credits and personnel

 Ján Lehotský - lead vocal, writer, keyboards
 Kamil Peteraj - lyrics
 
 Ivona Novotná - lead vocal
 Jozef Paulíny - lead vocal

References

General

Specific

External links 
 

1988 albums
Modus (band) albums